MONA is a project started by Nick Brown. Though there has been a revolving cast of band members, Nick has been the sole driving force behind the band. He began in Dayton, Ohio, though he is now based in Nashville, Tennessee. Brown revealed the band's name refers to his grandmother, Mona Brown.

The band rose to fame appearing as part of the BBC's Sound of 2011 poll; which was revealed on 5 December 2010. The band was also crowned the Brand New for 2011 title at the MTV Awards. Their debut album was released on May 16, 2011 in the UK through Zion Noiz Recordings/Island Records and was released on February 28, 2012 in the US through Zion Noiz Recordings/Mercury Records.

Career

Nick Brown (2009-2010) 
In April 2009, Brown was introduced to Saul Galpern, creator of Nude Records by a mutual friend. Soon after their online introduction, Galpern flew to Nashville to meet Nick. Having been very impressed by him, Galpern signed a management contract with the band which led to a record deal with Island Records and Mercury Records in September 2010.

MONA (2010–present)

On November 20, 2010, the band appeared on the BBC's Later... with Jools Holland, in which they performed the songs "Teenager", "Listen to Your Love" and "Lines In the Sand". On December 6, 2010, it was revealed that Mona had been longlisted on the BBC's Sound of 2011 poll, which predicts artists that will become successful in the year ahead. It was also revealed that month the band had made the longlist of MTV Awards' Brand New for 2011. On February 3, 2011, it was announced Mona had won the title.

The band released their debut single "Listen to Your Love" in the United Kingdom on September 13, 2010 through their own independent record label Zion Noiz Recordings. Second single "Trouble On the Way" was then released through Zion Noiz Recordings/Island Records on December 13, 2010. Mona released their third single "Teenager" on February 7, 2011. Their fourth and final UK single, "Shooting the Moon", was released on July 31, 2011.

In February 2011 MONA announced the release date of their self-titled debut album which was self-produced by Nick in their basement in Nashville and mixed by producer Rich Costey (Foo Fighters, Muse, Arctic Monkeys).

European album release (2011)
The official album artwork was released on March 21, 2011.

Mona was released in the United Kingdom on May 16, 2011. They also released the "Listen to Your Love - EP" the same day. 
Following the album's release the band embarked on a world-spanning tour which saw them play most of the world's largest and most prestigious festivals; including Glastonbury Festival and Reading and Leeds Festival in the UK, Summer Sonic Festival in Japan and Splendour in the Grass in Australia. As well as touring the festival circuit they supported fellow Nashville band Kings of Leon on selected dates of their summer tour, including shows at Slane Concert near Slane, County Meath, Ireland on May 28, 2011 and Hyde Park, London on June 22, 2011.

They also headlined their own tour of the United Kingdom and Europe in the summer and early fall of 2011 culminating in a sold-out show at London's O2 Shepherd's Bush Empire.

U.S. album release (2012–present)
MONA released their debut album in the United States on February 28, 2012. On that day they made their national television debut on The Tonight Show with Jay Leno performing "Lean Into The Fall", they also appeared on the Conan show on March 2, 2012, playing lead US single "Lean Into The Fall".

Torches & Pitchforks (2013)
On 12 June 2013 MONA announced that they would release their second album, Torches & Pitchforks, on Mercury Records July 23. The band also announced new tour dates, starting in Columbus, OH on July 7. Their 2013 single Goons (Baby, I Need It All) now serves as the goal song for the Tampa Bay Lightning of the NHL.

In the Middle EP (2016)
On September 23, 2016, MONA announced that they would release their new EP In the Middle on October 28, on Bright Antenna Records. This will be the first release from the band in 3 years. The band also announced a string of fall tour dates with labelmates The Wombats, followed by a late fall run with July Talk kicking off on Nov 3 2016.

Soldier On (2018)
MONA's third album Soldier On was released in the summer of 2018. The band toured the U.S. in support of the record, before going to Europe to tour as the opener for Kings of Leon in the winter of 2018–2019. In March 2019 MONA began an extensive 4-month run as the opener on both North American legs of Blue October's King tour.

Discography

Studio albums

Singles

Music videos

Band members 
Current members
Nick Brown – lead vocals, guitar, piano (2010–present)

Awards and nominations

References

External links

Interview with manager Saul Galpern, HitQuarters, Oct 2011
Interview with Nick, Jordan, Zach, & Vince

Musical quintets
Alternative rock groups from Ohio
Musical groups from Nashville, Tennessee
Musical groups established in 2007
2007 establishments in the United States
Bright Antenna Records artists
Mercury Records artists